Christian Friedrich Freiherr von Stockmar (22 August 1787 – 9 July 1863) was a German physician and statesman, who was a leading player in the affairs of the United Kingdom under Queen Victoria.

Early life and education
He was born in Coburg, Germany, of German parentage and Swedish descent. He was educated as a physician, and became the personal physician of Prince Leopold of Saxe-Coburg-Gotha in 1816 at the time of Leopold's marriage to Princess Charlotte of the United Kingdom, the only child of King George IV.

In service of King Leopold
Charlotte died giving birth to a stillborn son about a year later (had she lived, Leopold would have been Prince Consort of the United Kingdom), and Stockmar stayed in Leopold's service as his private secretary, comptroller of the household, and political advisor.

It is said, without real proof, that one of the services he provided was procuring a mistress for Leopold. He was not at all pleased when in 1828 one of his cousins, Caroline “Lina” Philippine Auguste Bauer, an actress, who bore a striking resemblance to Princess Charlotte, became the mistress of his master. She was brought over to England, together with her mother, but the affair did not last long and she returned to Germany and to the theater. After her death (and that of both King Leopold and Baron von Stockmar), her memoirs were published in which she claimed that she had contracted a morganatic marriage with Leopold and that she had received the title Countess of Montgomery. There has never been any evidence of such marriage, which furthermore was strongly denied by the son of the late Dr. von Stockmar.

After Leopold had briefly come under scrutiny for the position of King of the Greeks, he was made King of the Belgians in 1831. From then on, Stockmar took up residence in Coburg, continuing to advise Leopold.  In 1837, he was sent by Leopold to serve as advisor to Queen Victoria: one of his first tasks was to brief her on whether Leopold's nephew, Prince Albert (later Prince Consort), was a suitable mate. After the marriage of Victoria and Albert, Stockmar became their unofficial counsellor, including in the education of Victoria's son and heir, the future King Edward VII, and intervened in several crises.

Stockmar's memoirs were published as Memoirs of Baron Stockmar.

Ambassador to the German parliament
In 1848 he was made ambassador of the Duchy of Saxe-Coburg and Gotha to the parliament of the German Confederation.

His prominence in the United Kingdom's political circles led to resentment at what was seen to be Albert's (and, generally, German) intervention in the UK's affairs.

Stockmar was raised to the rank of baron by the King of Saxony. He died at Coburg.

Marriage
In August 1821 he married his maternal cousin, Fanny Sommer (1800-1868); they had three children:
 Ernst Alfred Christian von Stockmar (1823–1886)
 Marie von Stockmar (1827–1856), married Hermann Theodor Hettner
 Carl August von Stockmar (1836–1909), married Baroness Anna von Haynau (1847–1904), great-granddaughter of William I, Elector of Hesse and his mistress Rosa Dorothea Ritter.

Screen portrayals
 Paul Leyssac portrayed Baron Stockmar in Victoria the Great (1937)
 Noel Willman portrayed Baron Stockmar in Edward the Seventh (1975)
 David Suchet portrayed Baron Stockmar in Victoria & Albert (2001)
 Jesper Christensen portrayed Baron Stockmar in The Young Victoria (2009)

References

Bibliography
 
  3 volumes.
 
 
 
 Wangenheim, R. von (1996). Baron Stockmar: Eine coburgisch-englische Geschichte. Coburg 1996. (in German)

1787 births
1863 deaths
People from Coburg
People from Saxe-Coburg-Saalfeld
Barons of Germany
People of the Belgian Revolution